Joey Boy (born 1974) or Apisit Opasaimlikit, is a Thai hip hop singer and producer known as The Godfather of Thai Hip Hop.

Biography
Born into a Thai Chinese family, Joey Boy started listening to hip hop when he was 14 years old and skateboarding. In 1994, he was signed to Bakery Music. He finished high school from Wat Racha Thiwat.

Fun, Fun, Fun and work with Snow
In 1995, Joey Boy began collaborating with multi-platinum Canadian reggae artist, Snow. In 1995, Joey Boy flew to Toronto to record "Fun, Fun, Fun" with Snow and the single went on to become one of the top selling singles in Thailand.  The video for "Fun, Fun, Fun" featured Snow and Joey Boy touring Toronto. In 1997, Joey Boy appeared on Snow's single, "Me and Joey."

Gancore and the Black Eyed Peas

In 2000, he moved to GMM Grammy, where he runs his own record label, Gancore Club, and produces other artists.

He has spent time in the United States, where he became acquainted with will.i.am of The Black Eyed Peas, who co-produced Joey Boy's song "LA to BKK". He met will.i.am outside a disco in San Francisco and introduced himself. "Hey you, we're Thai rappers and we like your songs," he recalls saying to will.i.am. When the Black Eyed Peas came to Thailand in 2004, Joey Boy was the opening act and was invited onstage by will.i.am during the Black Eyed Peas' show. He also opened for the Black Eyed Peas when they played in Bangkok in 2006, and has continued to collaborate with the band on his albums.

Joey Boy was among the Thai pop music artists participating in Ramakien: A Rak Opera, a rock-opera adaptation of Thailand's national epic, the Ramakien, at the Lincoln Center for Performing Arts in 2006.

He made his feature film debut in December 2006 in The Possible as the leader of a 1970s Thai band patterned after The Impossibles who time travel to the present day. Joey Boy starred in the 2012 Thai comedy horror film Ghost Day as Mhen.

He then made a hit single "Teerak" featuring Tinglish.

Discography

Bakery Music
 Joey Boy (1995)
 Joey Man (1996)
 See Ya Later (Celebrate No Million Copies) (1997)
 Fun Fun Fun
 Fun Fun Fun/The Chinese Association Remix Single
 Fun Fun Fun 1,000,000
 Joey's Hit Pt. 1
 Bangkok (1998)
 Tourist
 Joey Boy Anthology
 The Greatest Beats 1994-2000 (2005)

Independent releases
 Joey Rama
 JB (EP featuring "LA/BKK")

Gancore Club/GMM Grammy
 Gancore Club Various Artists'
 Sorry, I'm Happy Raii Gor Ruk (ร้ายก็รัก EP) (EP, 2006)
 The Best of Joey Boy Original Motion Picture Soundtrack: The Possible (อัลบั้มเพลงประกอบภาพยนต์ 'เก๋า เก๋า (2006)

 MC Television 20 :Online 20''' : (No) On Air YouTube:JoeyBoy

See also
 Thaitanium

References

External links
 Official site

1975 births
Living people
Thai male actors
Thai people of Chinese descent
Thai Theravada Buddhists
21st-century Thai male singers
Thai rappers
Thai comedians
20th-century Thai male singers
Thai television personalities
Thai YouTubers